Louis Kenedy Jr.  (1910–1991) was an American merchant marine captain.

Kenedy was born July 16, 1910 in Stamford, Connecticut. His parents were well off.

He spent most of his life aboard sailing vessels out of Nova Scotia and the Caribbean. He continued this legacy of cargo trading under sail from the 1930s through the 1980s, five decades after sailing cargo had seemed obsolete. He had from an early age embarked on a lifestyle choice of living almost permanently on the high seas.  

Kenedy was featured in The Saturday Evening Post in an article entitled "The Incredible Captain Kenedy" in the winter of 1953-1954 written by Richard Thruelsen. These articles appear in the Dec 19, 1953; Dec 26, 1953; Jan 2, 1954; and Jan 9, 1954 issues. 

Kenedy is the inspiration for  “Captain Kennedy”, a song recorded in 1980 on the Hawks and Doves album by Neil Young. Young encountered Kennedy in South Florida and the Bahamas while Lou was cruising in his later years.

Ships owned and operated

ABUNDANCE 
Built 1919;
Rig: Tern Schooner;
Matierial: Wood;
Registered length: 138';
Beam: 27'8";
Draft: 15';
Builder: John McLean & Sons, Ltd.,
Mahone Bay, Nova Scotia;
Wrecked on Jamaica November 5, 1932

ADAMS
Launched: 1929;
Rig: Tern Schooner;
Material: Wood;
Registered Length: 164';
Beam: 32';
Draft: 16';
Builder: Arthur D. Storey,
Essex, Massachusetts;
Sank at sea, crew abandoned ship to BLAIRESK January 1934

SEA FOX

Launched 1888;
Rig: Gaff topsail schooner;
Material: iron plate;
Registered length: 115’;
Beam: 23’ 11”;
Draft: 12’;
Builder: Harlan & Hollingsworth,
Wilmington, Delaware;
Designer: A. Cass Canfield;
Lou won the first famous Round Barbados race in 1936; 
Sold and delivered to Baltimore, MD

WAWALOAM 
Launched 1919;
Rig: Tern Schooner;
Material: Steel;
Registered length: 135’;
Beam: 25’4”;
Draft: 12’;
Builder: Gear. Van Diesen,
Waterhuizen, Holland;
Sunk by  August 6, 1942. Crew and dog escaping in dories and after days, everyone picked up safely by tramp steamer IRISH ROSE.

City of New York
Launched 1885;
Rig: Barque, converted to tern schooner;
Material: Wood;
Registered Length: 170’;
Beam: 31’;
Draft: 14’ light/20’ loaded;
Builder: K. Larsen,
Arendal, Norway;
In 1944 Kenedy purchased the City of New York and the old ship was laid up as a hulk in Quebec. He converted the ship to a three masted schooner. Kenedy operated her hauling cargo under sail until 1952.

VEMA (ex-HUSSAR)
Launched 1923;
Rig: 3 masted gaff schooner;
Material: riveted nickel steel;
Registered length: 202’6”;
Beam: 33’2”;
Draft: 15’1”;
Builder: Burmeister Wain Shipyard,
Copenhagen;
Chartered and eventually sold to Lamont Geological Observatory in 1953.

ALPHA
Launched 1919;
Rig: Ketch;
Material: Iron;
Registered length: 80’;
Beam: 18’;
Draft: 6’6”;
Builder: unknown,
Waterhuizen, Holland;
Chartered for many years throughout the Bahamas.

AQUANAUT
Launched 1941;
Rig: motor vessel;
Material: wood;
Registered length: 83’;
Beam: 18’;
Draft: 6’6”;
Builder: Wheeler Shipyard,
Brooklyn, New York;
Used mainly for rescue, movie and Decca Navigator System research.

PIKE'S ARM
Launched 1962;
Rig: motor vessel;
Material: steel;
Registered length: 80’8”;
Beam: 22’6”;
Draft: 6’;
Builder: E.F. Barnes,
St. John's, Newfoundland;
Regularly carrying freight from Miami to Eleuthera.

SEA FOX (ex-PHYSALIA, ex-HAL-WAN II) 
Launched 1940;
Rig: Ketch motorsailer;
Material: wood;
Registered length: 62’9” (lengthened in 1961 to 67’9”);
Beam: 16’;
Draft: 6’2”;
Builder: Casey Boat Building,
Fairhaven, Massachusetts;
Kenedy's retirement home for 15 years of cruising with friends, family, but mostly enjoying having grandchildren aboard.

Lou Kenedy died on July 25, 1991 in Bridgewater, Nova Scotia. Lou and his wife Pat are buried in Lunenburg, Nova Scotia.

References

1910 births
People from Stamford, Connecticut
Sea captains
United States Merchant Mariners
1991 deaths
American expatriates in Canada
American expatriates in the Bahamas